Japanese accent may refer to:

 Japanese dialects, regional variants of Japanese pronunciation
 Japanese pitch accent, or high and low pronunciations to distinguish moras